The Battle of Edessa took place between the armies of the Roman Empire under the command of Emperor Valerian and Sasanian forces under Shahanshah (King of the Kings) Shapur I in 260. The Roman army was defeated and captured in its entirety by the Persian forces; for the first time, a Roman emperor was taken prisoner. As such, the battle is generally viewed as one of the worst disasters in military history.

Background and prelude
Prior to the battle, Shapur I had penetrated several times deeply into Roman territory, conquering and plundering Antioch in Syria in 253 or 256. After defeating the usurper Aemilianus and assuming the power for himself, Valerian arrived in the eastern provinces as soon as he could (254 or 255) and gradually restored order. Soon he had to confront a naval Gothic invasion in northern Asia Minor. The Goths ravaged Pontus and moved south into Cappadocia. An attempt by Valerian and his army in Antiocheia to intercept them failed because of the plague. While his army was in that weakened state, Shapur invaded northern Mesopotamia in 260, probably in early spring.

Battle 

In his sixties, the aged Valerian marched eastward to the Sasanian borders. According to Shapur I's inscription at the Ka'ba-ye Zartosht, Valerian met the main Persian army, under the command of Shapur I, between Carrhae and Edessa (in Middle Persian: Urhāy), with units from almost every part of the Roman Empire, together with Germanic allies, and was thoroughly defeated and captured with his entire army.

According to Roman sources, which are not very clear, the Roman army was defeated and besieged by the Persian forces. Valerian subsequently tried to negotiate, but he was captured; it is possible that his army surrendered after that. The prisoners included, according to Shapur's claims, many other high-ranking officials, including a praetorian prefect, possibly Successianus. It has also been claimed that Shapur went back on his word by having the emperor seized after agreeing to truce negotiations.

Aftermath 
There are varying accounts as to Valerian's fate following his capture at the hands of Shapur.

Some scholars claim Shapur sent Valerian and some of his army to the city of Bishapur, where they lived in relatively good conditions. Shapur used the remaining soldiers in engineering and development plans, as the Romans were skilled tradesmen and artisans. Band-e Kaisar (Caesar's dam) is one of the remnants of Roman engineering located near the ancient city of Shushtar.

According to another source (Lactantius), Shapur humiliated Valerian, using the former emperor as a human stepping-stool while mounting his horse. He was reportedly kept in a cage and was humiliated for the Persian emperor's pleasure, according to Aurelius Victor. Upon his death, Valerian's body was allegedly skinned and stuffed with, depending on which account, manure or straw, to produce a trophy of Roman submission preserved in a Persian temple.

However, there are also accounts that stipulate he was treated with respect, and that allegations of torture may have been fabricated by Christian historians of late antiquity to show the perils that befell persecutors of Christianity.

Following Valerian's capture, Shapur took the city of Caesarea and deported some 400,000 of its citizens to the southern provinces of the Sassanian Empire. He then raided Cilicia, but he was finally repulsed by a Roman force that was rallied by Macrianus, Callistus and Odenathus of Palmyra. 

Valerian's defeat at Edessa became the catalyst for a series of revolts that would lead to the temporary fragmentation of the Roman Empire. In the East, Macrianus used his control of Valerian's treasury to proclaim his sons Macrianus Minor and Quietus as emperors. Along the Danubian frontier, Ingenuus and Regalianus were also proclaimed emperors. In the West, the Roman governor Postumus took advantage of Gallienus' distraction to murder the Imperial heir, Saloninus, and take control of what is now called the Gallic Empire.

References

Sources 
 Lactantius, De Mortibus Persecutorum, v.
 Zosimus, New History, i.
 Abdolhossein Zarinkoob, Ruzgaran: tarikh-i Iran az aghz ta saqut saltnat Pahlvi, Sukhan, 1999. 
 Potter, David S., The Roman Empire at Bay AD 180–395, Routledge, 2004.

External links
 "Valerian" on De Imperatoribus Romanis.

260
Edessa
Edessa
3rd century in Iran
260s in the Roman Empire
History of Şanlıurfa Province
Shapur I
Edessa
Battles involving Germanic peoples
Battles involving the Goths